Steve Maltais (born January 25, 1969) is a Canadian former professional ice hockey forward. He was originally selected by the Washington Capitals in the 1987 NHL Entry Draft.

Playing career

Maltais was born in Arvida, Quebec. As a youth, he played in the 1982 Quebec International Pee-Wee Hockey Tournament with a minor ice hockey team from Arvida.

Maltais played parts of six seasons in the National Hockey League with the Capitals, Minnesota North Stars, Tampa Bay Lightning, Detroit Red Wings, and Columbus Blue Jackets. He also attended the Pittsburgh Penguins training camp in 1997, but was released prior to the start of the regular season.

He is best known, however, for his long tenure with the top-level minor league Chicago Wolves.  He joined the Wolves in 1994 when they were in the International Hockey League, and followed them into the American Hockey League. He retired in 2005, having played in all 11 of the team's seasons up to that point.  He is still the  Wolves all-time leading scorer. His 596 minor league goals is the eighth highest total in minor league history, and his 605 total goals (minor league and NHL) is good for 22nd all time.

His #11 was retired by the Wolves in a ceremony on April 15, 2006.

Career statistics

Awards 
2002-03: AHL John B. Sollenberger Trophy

References

External links

1969 births
Adirondack Red Wings players
Atlanta Knights players
Baltimore Skipjacks players
Canadian ice hockey left wingers
Chicago Wolves (IHL) players
Chicago Wolves players
Columbus Blue Jackets players
Cornwall Royals (OHL) players
Detroit Red Wings players
French Quebecers
Halifax Citadels players
Ice hockey people from Quebec
Kalamazoo Wings (1974–2000) players
Living people
Minnesota North Stars players
Sportspeople from Saguenay, Quebec
Tampa Bay Lightning players
Washington Capitals draft picks
Washington Capitals players